The 2022 Texas A&M Aggies baseball team represented Texas A&M University in the 2022 NCAA Division I baseball season. The Aggies played their home games at Blue Bell Park.

Previous season

The Aggies finished 29–27, 9–21 in the SEC to finish in last place in the West. The Aggies were not invited to the postseason. Rob Childress was fired after sixteen seasons as head coach. TCU head coach Jim Schlossnagle was hired on June 9, 2021.

Schedule and results

Standings

Results

See also
2022 Texas A&M Aggies softball team

References

Texas AandM
Texas A&M Aggies baseball seasons
Texas AandM Aggies baseball
Texas Aandm
College World Series seasons